Theta Upsilon Omega,  was a national collegiate fraternity in the United States. Representatives of several local fraternities at a December 1, 1923 meeting of locals, organized by the National Interfraternity Conference, determined to form a new national through amalgamation, resulting in the creation of Theta Upsilon Omega on May 2, 1924.

On April 23, 1938, Theta Upsilon Omega merged with Sigma Phi Epsilon.

Creation
The following nine locals were part of this meeting and concluded to form Theta Upsilon Omega.

Delta Tau, Worcester Polytechnic Institute
Phi Kappa Pi, Stevens Institute of Technology
Zeus Fraternity, University of Illinois
Kappa Sigma Phi, Temple University
Beta Kappa Psi, Bucknell University
Kappa Tau Omega, The George Washington University
Sigma Beta, University of New Hampshire
Delta Kappa Nu, Penn State University
Phi Alpha Pi, Davidson College

In addition, at the Charter Arch Convocation (held at Bucknell on February 21–23, 1924), Pi Rho Phi of Westminster College petitioned for membership and was granted as the youngest charter chapter.

Merle C. Cowden, of Worcester, was chosen first national president.

Additional chapters were chartered, but growth stalled during the Great Depression.

In 1938, following negotiations, Theta Upsilon Omega merged with Sigma Phi Epsilon. Of its thirteen active chapters, four Theta Upsilon Omega chapters merged with existing SigEp chapters, and seven others were granted new charters in Sigma Phi Epsilon. One chapter reverted to local status under its original name, and one chapter merged with Theta Chi on its campus.

Insignia
The insignia of Theta Upsilon Omega:

Badge - Small pin of blue enamel with a circular contour and in the center of which is a ten-pointed gold star enclosing a cut diamond. The badge will have three short arms which are equidistant around the pin, and on them, in gold, will be the letters Theta Upsilon Omega. In the spaces between the arms will be six pearls, two between each pair of arms. Only charter members will be privileged to wear the diamond centered pins, and initiated members will have to substitute a ruby for the diamond or wear a plain pin.
Pledge button - A cross fitchée of midnight blue with a border of gold
Recognition pin - A mural crown from the top of which issues a dragon's head
Official seal - A voided fusil bearing inscriptions regarding the fraternity and having in the center, the Squire's helmet facing to the left
Colors  - Midnight blue and gold
Flower - dark red rose

Chapters
Chapter information from The Omegan of ΘΥΩ, The Journal of ΣΦΕ, Baird's Manual (20th), and the Baird's Manual Online Archive. Active chapters at the time of the merger noted in bold, inactive chapters at the time of the merger noted in italics.

Notable alumni
Thomas Cunningham Cochran - Republican member of the U.S. House of Representatives from Pennsylvania 1927-1935.
Paul J. Kramer - American biologist and plant physiologist
Thomas Z. Minehart - Treasurer of Pennsylvania, Auditor General of Pennsylvania.

References

1924 establishments in Pennsylvania
1938 disestablishments in the United States
Defunct former members of the North American Interfraternity Conference
Student organizations established in 1924
Sigma Phi Epsilon